The Infrastructure and Projects Authority (IPA) is the United Kingdom government's centre of expertise for infrastructure and major projects. The IPA sits at the heart of government, reporting to the Cabinet Office and HM Treasury. The core teams include experts in infrastructure, project delivery and project finance who work with government departments and industry. 

The IPA supports the successful delivery of all types of infrastructure and major projects; ranging from railways, schools, hospitals and housing, to defence, IT and major transformation programmes. The IPA leads the project delivery and project finance professions across government.

The IPA was formed in 2016 by the merger of Infrastructure UK (IUK) and the Major Projects Authority (MPA). The IPA Chief Executive was Tony Meggs until July 2019, when he was replaced by Nick Smallwood.

IUK was established in 2010 to support major infrastructure projects involving public sector capital; and the MPA was established in 2011 with a mandate to oversee and assure the largest government projects.

In December 2017 the IPA issued the Transforming Infrastructure Performance report aimed at achieving annual savings of £15 billion per year in infrastructure procurement by increasing collaboration and innovation. On 13 September 2021, a follow-up report, Transforming Infrastructure Performance: Roadmap to 2030, was published alongside the  National Infrastructure and Construction Pipeline forecasting £650bn investment in UK infrastructure over the next decade.

References

See also 
Infrastructure Client Group

2016 establishments in the United Kingdom
Cabinet Office (United Kingdom)
Economic development in the United Kingdom
HM Treasury
Infrastructure organizations
Organisations based in the City of Westminster
United Kingdom industrial planning policy
Public bodies and task forces of the United Kingdom government